In the 1939 Major League Baseball season, the St. Louis Browns finished eighth in the American League with a record of 43 wins and 111 losses.

Regular season 
The Browns lost a franchise record 111 games—not surpassed until the 2018 Baltimore Orioles (the team moved from St. Louis to Baltimore in )—and finished 64.5 games out of first place. The Browns played particularly poorly at home, posting an 18–59 record. The 59 home losses stood as the most in a modern-era major league season until it was matched by the 2019 Detroit Tigers, who went 22–59 at home. Because of the shorter season, the Browns home winning percentage in 1939 (.234) is still the worst in history.

Browns pitching struggled tremendously. The pitchers allowed 739 walks, which was over 100 walks more than the next worse team. The team had an earned run average of 6.01. The next time that a team would have an ERA over 6.00 was the 1996 Detroit Tigers, who had an ERA of 6.38.

Season standings

Record vs. opponents

Notable transactions 
 May 13, 1939: Red Kress, Beau Bell, Bobo Newsom, and Jim Walkup were traded by the St. Louis Browns to the Detroit Tigers for Vern Kennedy, Bob Harris, George Gill, Roxie Lawson, Chet Laabs, and Mark Christman.

Roster

Player stats

Batting

Starters by position 
Note: Pos = Position; G = Games played; AB = At bats; H = Hits; Avg. = Batting average; HR = Home runs; RBI = Runs batted in

Other batters 
Note: G = Games played; AB = At bats; H = Hits; Avg. = Batting average; HR = Home runs; RBI = Runs batted in

Pitching

Starting pitchers 
Note: G = Games pitched; IP = Innings pitched; W = Wins; L = Losses; ERA = Earned run average; SO = Strikeouts

Other pitchers 
Note: G = Games pitched; IP = Innings pitched; W = Wins; L = Losses; ERA = Earned run average; SO = Strikeouts

Relief pitchers 
Note: G = Games pitched; W = Wins; L = Losses; SV = Saves; ERA = Earned run average; SO = Strikeouts

Farm system 

LEAGUE CHAMPIONS: Springfield, Lafayette

References

External links 
1939 St. Louis Browns team page at Baseball Reference
1939 St. Louis Browns season at baseball-almanac.com

St. Louis Browns seasons
Saint Louis Browns season
St Louis Browns